The 2011 Nürburgring GP3 Series round was a GP3 Series motor race held on July 23 and 24, 2011 at Nürburgring, Germany. It is the fifth round of the 2011 GP3 Series. The race supported the 2011 German Grand Prix.

Classification

Race 1

Notes
 – Nunes was penalised after the race with a 20-second addition to his race time for causing a collision.

Race 2

Standings after the round

Drivers' Championship standings

Teams' Championship standings

 Note: Only the top five positions are included for both sets of standings.

See also 
 2011 German Grand Prix
 2011 Nürburgring GP2 Series round

References

External links
GP3 Series official website: Results

2011 GP3 round reports
2011 in German motorsport
Sport in Rhineland-Palatinate